Tanusri Saha-Dasgupta is an Indian physicist. She is a Senior Professor and Director at S.N. Bose National Centre for Basic Sciences.

Life
She graduated from the renowned Rajabazar Science College, University of Calcutta.
She is a Swarnajayanti Fellow. She is an elected fellow of The World Academy of Science (2019), American Physical Society (2015),
Indian National Academy of Sciences (2021), Indian Academy of Sciences, Bangalore (2010), National Academy of Sciences, India(2010),
West Bengal Academy of Science & Technology,(2013). She is recipient of J. C. Bose National Fellowship (2020), APJ Kalam HPC award (2018), "MRSI-ICSC Superconductivity & Materials Science Annual Prize" for the year 2016, Dr. P. Sheel Memorial Lecture Award, National Academy of Sciences, 2012,
and appointed Head of MPG-India partnergroup program, 2005.

Works

References

External links
Academic.research.microsoft.com
Chemfedds.com

Indian women physicists
Bengali physicists
20th-century Indian physicists
Living people
University of Calcutta alumni
Academic staff of the University of Calcutta
Year of birth missing (living people)
20th-century Indian women
Women scientists from West Bengal
Fellows of the American Physical Society